Hasanuzzaman Khan (5 October 1926 – 18 May 2015) was a Bangladeshi journalist. He was awarded Ekushey Padak in 1994 by the Government of Bangladesh.

Career
Khan worked in several newspapers - Azad, Swadhinata, Pakistan Observer, New Nation, The Bangladesh Today and Financial Express.

References

1926 births
2015 deaths
Bangladeshi journalists
Recipients of the Ekushey Padak
Burials at Mirpur Martyred Intellectual Graveyard